The Fujifilm FinePix S8000 is a digital camera manufactured by Fujifilm. It is part of their FinePix S-series range. It is a compact camera loosely resembling a digital SLR camera. It is Fujifilm's first superzoom camera with optical image stabilization, and also features an 18x zoom lens.

Specification
Below is the specification for the Fujifilm FinePix S8000

Notes

S8000